, known in Europe as Princess Debut: The Royal Ball, is a rhythm otome game published by Natsume and developed by Cave for the Nintendo DS.

The illustration and package design was done by Kotori Momoyuki, a manga artist serialized in Kodansha's Nakayoshi.

Plot
Princess Debut opens with the player character speaking to a friend of hers. The former laments her boredom and wishes to be whisked away by a prince.

After the two finish their dialogue and the player character arrives home, a strange girl and an even stranger creature burst forth from her closet.  When asked about her identity, this girl responds that she is the same person as the player character, but from another world, known as the Flower Kingdom.  Further, she explains that she is a princess there and that she will soon be required to dance at the prestigious Ball of Saint-Lyon.  However, because the Princess lacks both talent and taste for dancing, she wants the player character to go in her stead.

The player character accepts, and from that point forth the player has 30 days to practice dancing and find a prince to be their partner for the ball.

Depending on where you go in the day and what you say to people, many different things can happen up until the ultimate ball at Saint-Lyons. Depending on which partner you have and how much in love you are (the 'love' is rated on a percentage meter), there are lots of different endings.

Development
Princess Debut is the first game to be commissioned directly by Natsume Inc. in the United States, as opposed to the development originating in Japan. Natsume Inc.'s president, Hiro Maekawa, conceptualized the idea of a game targeted towards a young female demographic prior, but was unable to find a development partner to create it with. Eventually, Maekawa would meet up with Cave, a company best known for their shoot 'em ups, and learned that they shared a similar idea, thus making them a fit for Natsume to realize the game's vision through.

Characters
In the opening dialogue, the player character's friend Catherine suggests that certain boys at the school they attend may be somewhat like princes.  Each of these boys is described as having traits that are shared by a prince in the Flower Kingdom.

Victor (Vince) [Kid (キっド kiddo)]: The class clown. He's always running around playing jokes on people. Catherine points out he's "just so cute! Somehow, you just can't hate him."

Keith (Kiefer): Victor's polar opposite. He is a cool-mannered, perfect student, frequently seen reading upper-level books. He also scores high in his classes.

Carlos (Cesar) [Charl (シャルル sharuru)]: The school's flirt. He is always found hitting on girls. Your character will mention that he just hit on you the previous day. His pick up line was "Won't you dance the waltz of love with me?"

Leon (Liam) [Randy (ランディ randi)]: A kind and gentle soul, he is considered to be very considerate by his classmates. He is known for taking care of the classroom flowers even though he does not have to. Your character views him "like a big brother you can always count on."

Kyle (Klaus) [Karu (カル karu)]: The star athlete. He has many fans, is considered to be cool and very popular. The player character thinks he is out of her league. Her friend reminds her that she has never even tried to speak with him and warns her not to jump to conclusions.

Lucas (Luciano) [Hayato (ハヤト hayato)]: The player character's childhood friend. She considers him "pretty cute," but he has a bad sense of direction, to the extent of forgetting his way home. However, he refuses to acknowledge this deficiency. Catherine comments that he is endearing.

Kip [Tap (タップ tappu)]: Assists the Princess in coming to your world and then assists you during your stay in the kingdom.

Tony [Coach (コーチ ko-chi)]: He is your dance partner for the tutorial and is also your dance partner if one of the princes is not your dance partner. Can use magic to turn himself into a gentleman rabbit.

Reception

Princess Debut received "average" reviews according to the review aggregation website Metacritic. IGN criticized the game for its slow pacing and repetitive nature, stating that "After the initial hump of slow progression players can go through the story to get over a dozen different endings, which will take forever." In Japan, Famitsu gave it a score of two sevens and two sixes for a total of 26 out of 40.

References

External links
Official Princess Debut website 

2008 video games
Music video games
Natsume (company) games
Nintendo DS games
Nintendo DS-only games
Otome games
Video games developed in Japan
Video games featuring female protagonists
Single-player video games